USS Concord (SP-773), later known as USS Mendota (YT-33) and again later as USS Muscotah (YT-33) was a tugboat acquired by the U.S. Navy during World War I. Concord was initially assigned to North Atlantic towing duties, and later was assigned as harbor tug at the Washington Navy Yard. She was sold in 1937.

Constructed in Philadelphia 

The third ship to be so named by the U.S. Navy, Concord (No. 773) was built in 1898 by Charles Hillman, Philadelphia, Pennsylvania; purchased by the Navy 22 September 1917; outfitted by Boston Navy Yard; and commissioned 20 November 1917.

She was renamed and reclassified Mendota (YT-33) on 20 November 1920, and her name was again changed on 30 January 1932 to Muscotah.

World War I service 
 
Concord sailed from Philadelphia 15 December 1917 for Bermuda where she joined Galatia and Gypsum Queen to tow three French submarine chasers to Ponta Delgada, Azores. She continued to Brest, France, arriving 22 February 1918 for service as harbor tug until 25 October 1919.

She returned to Norfolk, Virginia, 28 November, and the next month reported to Washington Navy Yard where she was placed "in service" and served as a harbor tug.

Final decommissioning 

She was placed out of service 4 November 1934 and sold 30 April 1937.

References
 
 USS Concord (SP-773), 1917-1937. Later renamed Mendota and Muscotah (both as YT-33)

World War I auxiliary ships of the United States
Tugs of the United States Navy
Ships built in Philadelphia
1898 ships